William C. Meffert (December 23, 1842March 21, 1918) was a German American immigrant, leatherworker, politician, and Wisconsin pioneer.  He was a member of the Wisconsin State Senate, representing Iowa and Richland counties in 1882 and 1883.  Earlier in life, he served as an enlisted volunteer in the Union Army throughout the American Civil War.

Biography
William C. Meffert was born on December 23, 1842, in the town of Ems, in what was then the Rhine Province in the Kingdom of Prussia.  He emigrated to the United States with his parents in 1845.  They came first to Milwaukee, then settled at Mineral Point, in the Wisconsin Territory.  His father and sister died of Cholera in 1852.  The remainder of the family moved to Dodgeville, Wisconsin, in Iowa County, where William apprenticed as a leatherworker and saddlemaker.

At the outbreak of the American Civil War, he volunteered for service in the Union Army and was enrolled as a private in Company H of the 3rd Wisconsin Infantry Regiment.  He was made the color-bearer for the regiment.  The regiment was sent to the eastern theater of the war.  With the regiment, he participated in the Shenandoah Valley campaign, the Battle of Antietam, and the Battle of Gettysburg.  After Gettysburg, the regiment went to assist in quelling the New York City draft riots.

After New York, Meffert's three-year enlistment was set to expire and he re-enlisted as a veteran. The regiment joined the Atlanta Campaign of William Tecumseh Sherman, then participated in the March to the Sea and the Carolinas Campaign, ending the war occupying Raleigh, North Carolina.

After the war, Meffert wrote a short account of an incident at the Battle of Chancellorsville, where his company spontaneously charged a Confederate company without orders and captured it, but two of his friends were wounded in the process and ended up left on the battlefield for twelve days.  The men were captured and re-united 25 years later in Wisconsin.  Meffert also maintained an extensive diary through his war service, which was donated to the Wisconsin Historical Society after his death.

Meffert moved to Arena, Wisconsin, in 1867.  In 1874, he became a part-owner of the newspaper the Arena Star and remained for two years.  He was elected to the Wisconsin State Senate in 1881 and served in the 1882 and 1883 sessions of the Legislature.  He was not a candidate for re-election in 1884.

Electoral history

Wisconsin Senate (1881)

| colspan="6" style="text-align:center;background-color: #e9e9e9;"| General Election, November 8, 1881

Works

References

1842 births
1918 deaths
People from the Rhine Province
German emigrants to the United States
People from Mineral Point, Wisconsin
People from Dodgeville, Wisconsin
People from Arena, Wisconsin
People of Wisconsin in the American Civil War
University of Wisconsin–Madison alumni
Union Army soldiers
Republican Party Wisconsin state senators
19th-century American politicians